Parham's riffle minnow (Alburnoides parhami) is a species of small (10.8 cm max length) freshwater fish in the family Cyprinidae. It is endemic to the Caspian Sea basin river drainages in Iran.

References 

Parham's riffle minnow
Fish of Iran
Fish of the Caspian Sea
Parham's riffle minnow